James S. Nunneley (July 31, 1910April 20, 1967) was a Michigan politician.

Early life and education
Nunneley was born on July 31, 1910 in Mount Clemens, Michigan. Nunneley received an education from Mount Clemens public schools, and in 1933 graduated from Michigan State University.

Military career 
Nunneley served as a lieutenant in the United States Navy in World War II.

Career
Nunneley continued to manage his family's business in Mount Clemens when he returned from military service. Nunneley owned a shoe store. Nunneley served on the Mount Clemens Board of Education. On September 1, 1964, Nunneley won the Republican nomination for the Michigan House of Representatives seat representing the 75th district, but was defeated in the general election by Victor R. Steeh on November 3, 1964. On November 8, 1966, Nunneley was elected to the Michigan House of Representatives where he represented the 75th district, beginning his term on January 1, 1967. Nunneley's victory was considered an upset. On April 20, 1967, Nunneley passed his first bill through the state house. It sought to require identification for ice fishing shanties. According to State Representative Charles H. Varnum, Nunneley did not need to speak about his bill to the state house for it to pass, and Nunneley was given "a lot of kidding" because of this. The same day the bill passed, Nunneley died of an apparent heart attack in his Capitol office. The following state representatives acted as honorary pallbearers for Nunneley: Robert C. Stites, Allen F. Rush, Edgar A. Geerlings, William L. Jowett, Warren N. Goemaere, Harold B. Clark, John T. Kelsey, and Joseph M. Snyder. Nunneley's death left the state house in partisan deadlock, with 54 Republican legislators and 54 Democratic legislators.

Personal life
Nunneley, at the time of his death, was a widower who lived with his father. Nunneley had three children. Nunneley was a member of AMVETS, the Elks, and the Sigma Alpha Epsilon fraternity. Nunneley was Presbyterian.

Electoral history

References

1910 births
1967 deaths
Presbyterians from Michigan
People from Mount Clemens, Michigan
Republican Party members of the Michigan House of Representatives
Michigan State University alumni
Military personnel from Michigan
United States Navy personnel of World War II
20th-century American politicians